Ouattara Lagazane (born 1 January 1963 in Bondoukou) is an Ivorian sprinter who specialized in the 200 metres.

Lagazane finished seventh in 4 x 100 metres relay at the 1993 World Championships, together with teammates Ibrahim Meité, Jean-Olivier Zirignon and Frank Waota.

Participating in the 1992 Summer Olympics, he was knocked out in the quarterfinals.

External links

1963 births
Living people
Ivorian male sprinters
Athletes (track and field) at the 1992 Summer Olympics
Olympic athletes of Ivory Coast
People from Bondoukou